The 2006 Asian Junior Men's Volleyball Championship was held in Azadi Sport Complex, Tehran, Iran from 13 September to 21 September 2006.

Pools composition
The teams are seeded based on their final ranking at the 2004 Asian Junior Men's Volleyball Championship.

* Withdrew

Preliminary round

Pool A

|}

|}

Pool B

|}

|}

Pool C

|}

|}

Pool D

|}

|}

Quarterfinals 
 The results and the points of the matches between the same teams that were already played during the preliminary round shall be taken into account for the Quarterfinals.

Pool E

|}

|}

Pool F

|}

|}

Pool G

|}

|}

Pool H

|}

|}

Final round
 The results and the points of the matches between the same teams that were already played during the previous rounds shall be taken into account for the final round.

Classification 13th–15th

|}

|}

Classification 9th–12th

|}

|}

Classification 5th–8th

|}

|}

Championship

|}

|}

Final standing

Team Roster
Saber Narimannejad, Mansour Zadvan, Mohammad Mousavi, Pouria Fathollahi, Abdolreza Alizadeh, Ali Najafi, Mostafa Sharifat, Ali Sajjadi, Arash Keshavarzi, Rahman Davoudi, Ashkan Derakhshan, Yashar Taeihagh
Head Coach: Sergey Gribov

Awards
MVP:  Pouria Fathollahi
Best Scorer:  Hiromitsu Matsuzaki
Best Spiker:  Guttikonda Pradeep
Best Blocker:  Mohammad Mousavi
Best Server:  Mansour Zadvan
Best Setter:  Shogo Okamoto
Best Digger:  Tomohiko Sakanashi
Best Receiver:  Chien Wei-lun

External links
 www.asianvolleyball.org

A
V
Asian men's volleyball championships
International volleyball competitions hosted by Iran
Asian Junior